TNFAIP3-interacting protein 1, also known as ABIN-1, is a protein that in humans is encoded by the TNIP1 gene.

Association with autoimmune diseases 

Genetic variations within the region of the TNIP1 gene have been shown to have association with several autoimmune diseases:
Systemic Sclerosis;
Psoriasis;
Psoriatic arthritis;
Systemic Lupus Erythematosus
Type-1 autoimmune hepatitis
Lupus nephritis
TNIP1 dysfunction or deficiency contributes to  hyperinflammarion and may predispose healthy cells to the inflammatory response to otherwise innocuous TLR ligand exposure.

Association with neurodegenerative diseases 
A recent genome-wide association study (GWAS) has found that genetic variations in TNIP1 are associated with late-onset sporadic Alzheimer’s disease (LOAD).

Interactions 

TNIP1  contains multiple amino acid sites that are phosphorylated and ubiquitinated, and has been shown to interact with TNFAIP3, MAP3K1, and MAPK1.

Regulation 

TNIP1 was shown to be part of a transcription module controlled by BCL3. BCL3 gen was found to be strongly associated with Aβ42 after conditioning for APOE and was found as upregulated in the brain of patients with LOAD.

References

Further reading

External links